Siya Simetu (born 22 August 1991) is a South African first-class cricketer. He was included in the South Western Districts cricket team squad for the 2015 Africa T20 Cup.

References

External links
 

1991 births
Living people
South African cricketers
South Western Districts cricketers
Cricketers from Cape Town